John Bonney (21 May 1946 – 20 February 2022) was an Australian rules footballer who played with St Kilda.

A wingman recruited from the small Tasmanian club Cooee, Bonney played in the St Kilda grand final team of 1971. As an aspiring young player, he rang Collingwood hoping for a game, but was turned away. Wanting to play with a strong team, he then called St Kilda (which played in the 1966 VFL Grand Final), was accepted and played from the bench in the first game. In a career that was riddled with injuries, his nose was broken nine times, and he had a near fatal injury in which his spleen was punctured by a kick to the stomach. He missed the 1970 and 1974 VFL seasons due to family reasons and the 1972 VFL season due to a knee injury.

Bonney died in Cobden, Victoria, on 20 February 2022 at the age of 75.

References

External links

1946 births
2022 deaths
Australian rules footballers from Tasmania
Cooee Football Club players
St Kilda Football Club players
Tasmanian Football Hall of Fame inductees